Encuentro por Guatemala ("EG")– a Spanish name variously translated as "Encounter for Guatemala" (for example, by the BBC and CNN), or as "Together for Guatemala" (Reuters) – was a Guatemalan political party; encuentro may also translate as "gathering", "meeting", or "union".

Its logo is a red circle with four green dots on its circumference, representing the coming together of the four peoples that make up the Guatemalan nationality: Mayas, Garifunas, Xincas and Ladinos.

History

Foundation and early splits
The party was founded in 2007, in the run-up to that year's 9 September general election. Its presidential candidate was Rigoberta Menchú, the Nobel Peace Prize-winning indigenous activist, running on a ticket with businessman Luis Fernando Montenegro as her vice-presidential hopeful. They secured 3.09% of the popular vote.

In the Congressional election held on the same day, the party fared somewhat better, receiving 6.17% of the popular vote, which was enough to secure them four national-list deputies in Congress for the 2008–12 legislative period: Armando Sánchez Gómez, Rodolfo Aníbal García, Nineth Montenegro and Otilia Lux. Subsequently, only Nineth Montenegro has remained with the party; the other three deputies have left Encounter for Guatemala to operate as independents. Rodolfo Aníbal García has since formed a new political party, the New Republic Movement (Movimiento Nueva República (MNR)). Rigoberta Menchú has gone on to form the Winaq political party. Both MNR and WInaq participated in the 2011 elections as part of the Broad Leftist Front (Frente Amplio de Izquierda).

Shift to the right
For the 2011 elections, Encuentro formed a political alliance with center-right ViVa, another political party; its presidential and vice-presidential candidates were Harold Caballeros and Efraín Medina, with party leader Nineth Montenegro leading the list of legislative candidates.
The alliance between the two parties eventually broke up and the party ran on its own again in 2015, receiving 6.35% of the national vote for the legislature, while its presidential ticket with José Ángel López and Peter Lamport fared significantly worse garnering only 0.91% of the vote.

Electoral decline and closure
In the 2019 election, the party chose Manfredo Marroquín as its presidential candidate. He came in fourteenth place with 1.15% of the vote. In the Legislative Election, the party won 1.79% of the vote and no seats in Congress. Having failed to secure the minimum of 5% of the popular vote or one seat in Congress, Encuentro por Guatemala forfeited its registration as a party.

Election results

Congress of the Republic

President of the Republic of Guatemala

Notes

References

External links
Encuentro por Guatemala party web site
¿Qué es Winaq?

2007 establishments in Guatemala
Indigenist political parties in North America
Political parties established in 2007
Social democratic parties in North America
Socialist parties in Guatemala
Defunct political parties in Guatemala
Political parties disestablished in 2020